This is a list of naval ships that were in service with the naval forces of Iran after 1885, and had been either decommissioned or lost since then.

List of ships

Cruiser

Persepolis (1885–1925)

Destroyer

Damavand (ex-Artemiz) (1966–199?), used to be the British ; it was sold to Iran in 1966 and retired in the early 1990s.
Babr, used to be the American  (1973–1994), it was sold to Iran in 1973 and has been non-operational since 1994.
Palang, used to be the American  (1972–199?), it was sold to Iran in 1972 and retired in the 1990s.

Sloop
Babr (1931–1941), Sunk by HMAS Yarra on 25 August 1941 in Khorramshahr.
Palang (1931–1941), Sunk by HMS Shoreham on 25 August 1941 in Abadan.

Frigate

Sahand (1971–1988): Sunk by U.S. warships and aircraft in 1988 in U.S. Operation Praying Mantis.
 (1949–1969)
 (1949–1966)

Corvette

Milanian (1969–1982), used to be the American PF-105, In service
Kahnamuie (1969–1982), used to be the American PF-106, In service

Motor launch
Babolsar (1935–1972)
Gorgan (1935–1972)
Sefidroud (1935–1972)
Azerbaijan (1935–1941)
Gilan (1935–1941)
Mazandaran (1935–1941)

Patrol craft

Susa (1885–?)
Mozaffari (1903–1914; 1918–1936)
Shahin (1923–1941)
Chahrogh (1931–1941)
Simorgh (1931–1941)
Karkas (1931–1941)
Chahbaaz (1931–1941)
Azerbaijan (1905–1918)
Gilan (1905–1918)
Khorasan (1905–1918)
Mazandaran (1905–1918)
Perebonia (1905–1920)

Submarine
Kousseh (1978–1979)

Minelayer

Iran Ajr (1978–1987): Seized and scuttled by U.S. Navy SEALs in the 1987 U.S. Operation Prime Chance.

Minesweeper
Shahbaz (1959–1975)
Shahrokh (1959–?)
Simorgh (1961–1981)
Karkas (1962–?)
Harischi (ex-Kahnamuie) (1964–?)
Riazi (1964–?)

Missile boat
Paykan (1978–1980): Sunk in Operation Morvarid on 29 November 1980 by Iraqi forces.
Joshan (1978–1988): Sunk in Operation Praying Mantis on 18 April 1988 by US forces.
Mehran (1959–1980): Sunk in Iran–Iraq War

Landing craft
Qeshm (1964–?)

Training ship
Homai (1925–1941)
Kish (1970–?)

Barracks ship

Raffael (1976–1983)
Michelange (1976–1983)

Repair ship

Sohrab (1961–1974)
Chabahar (1971–1985)

Tug
Nirou 
Yadak Bar

Replenishment oiler

Kharg (1984–2021) : Caught fire and sank on 2 June 2021, near Jask in the Gulf of Oman

Harbour tanker
Hormuz
Lengeh

Fast dispatch boat
Tahmadou

Tender boat
Sirry

See also

 List of naval ship classes of Iran
 List of current ships of the Islamic Republic of Iran Navy
 List of equipment of the Navy of the Islamic Revolutionary Guard Corps

References

 
 
 

Naval ships of Iran
Iranian military-related lists
Lists of ships of Iran